OldVersion.com is an archive website that stores and distributes older versions of primarily Internet-related IBM PC compatible and Apple Macintosh freeware and shareware application software. Alex Levine and Igor Dolgalev founded the site in 2001.

Levine created the site because "Companies make a lot of new versions. They're not always better for the consumer." As reported in The Wall Street Journal, 'Users often try to downgrade when they find confusing changes in a new version or encounter software bugs, or just decide they want to go back to a more familiar version,' said David Smith, an analyst at research firm Gartner. 'Often, they discover that the downgrade process is complicated, if not impossible.'

When OldVersion.com was launched it offered 80 versions of 14 programs.

By 2005, over 500 versions were posted.

By 28 August 2007, this had grown to 2388 versions of 179 programs, in categories such as "graphics", "file-sharing", "security" and "enterprise". The site also carries 600+ versions of 35 Macintosh programs.

In 2007, PC World labeled the site "a treasure trove ... of older-but-better software";

In 2005, National Review called OldVersion.com a "champion" for "software conservatives".

According to Alexander Levine's own words, he has received threats from proprietary software developers for running an archive of obsolete internet browsers with known critical security flaws.

See also
 Abandonware
 Legacy code
 Planned obsolescence
 Technology acceptance model
 Switching barriers

References

External links
 

Internet properties established in 2001
Download websites
Web archiving initiatives